André Durville (1896-1979) was a French physician who, with his brother, Gaston Durville, was one of the initiators of naturism in France during the interwar period.

Biography
André Durville is the son of Hector Durville occultist.

André and his brother Gaston, influenced by Dr. Paul Carton, were advocates for natural, healthy diets. They developed this philosophy of natural diets and lifestyle to the advocacy of naturism.

With his brother, Gaston he established the Naturist Society in 1927. In 1928 the brothers founded the Physiopolis naturist camp on Platais island in the Seine  from the centre of Paris. In 1930 they established the naturist village of Heliopolis on the Île du Levant, an island in the Mediterranean Sea.

Works
La cuisine saine with Gaston Durville.
L’art d'être heureux with Gaston Durville.
La cure mentale with Gaston Durville.
Translated The Kybalion from English to French :fr:Le Kybalion
Prentice Mulford's  as

Notes and references

External links
Identifiants et Référentiels

French naturists
20th-century French physicians
Social nudity advocates
1896 births
1979 deaths